Pauline is an unincorporated community in Adams County, Nebraska, United States.

History
Pauline was laid out in 1887 when the railroad was extended to that point. It was named for Pauline S. Ragan, the wife of a railroad official. A post office was established at Pauline in 1888, and remained in operation until it was discontinued in 1967.

References

Unincorporated communities in Adams County, Nebraska
Unincorporated communities in Nebraska